Valery Fomichev (born 23 March 1988) is a Belarusian professional footballer.

During the winter of 2013 Fomichev accepted the citizenship of Kazakhstan.

Honours
Torpedo-BelAZ Zhodino
Belarusian Cup winner: 2015–16

References

External links 
 
 

1988 births
Living people
Belarusian footballers
Association football goalkeepers
Belarusian expatriate footballers
Expatriate footballers in Kazakhstan
Expatriate footballers in Turkey
Expatriate footballers in Uzbekistan
FC Belshina Bobruisk players
FC Dynamo Brest players
FC Kommunalnik Slonim players
FC Baranovichi players
FC Gorodeya players
FC Shakhter Karagandy players
Orduspor footballers
FC AGMK players
FC Torpedo-BelAZ Zhodino players
FC Ordabasy players
FC Krumkachy Minsk players
FC Arsenal Dzerzhinsk players